Miro Gavran (born 3 May 1961) is a Croatian writer of short stories, fiction and drama. His works have been translated into 40 languages, making him the most translated Croatian writer, and his books have come out in 250 different editions at home and abroad. His dramas and comedies have had more than 400 theatre first nights around the world and have been seen by more than two million theatre attendants.

He has served as president of Matica hrvatska since 2021.

Early life
Gavran was born in Gornja Trnava, PR Croatia, at the time part of Yugoslavia.

Writing career 
He debuted in 1983 with the drama Creon's Antigone, speaking out forcefully about political manipulation. This was followed three years later by the drama Night of the Gods, the theme being the relationship between the artist and the powers-that-be under a totalitarian system. He then wrote a cycle of plays concentrating on male-female relations, in which his heroes were often great historical persons. He has created a series of complex female characters. His heroines are both strong and emotional. He has written 55 plays to date, including Death of an Actor, All About Women, All About Men, George Washington's Loves, Chekhov Says Good-Bye to Tolstoy, How To Kill The President, Greta Garbo's Secret, Laughing Prohibited, Parallel Worlds, Nora in Our Time, My Wife's Husband, Dr Freud's Patient, The Doll, Ice Cream, Beer, Your Every Birthday, Perfect Partner, etc.

He has had ten novels published: Forgotten Son, How We Broke Our Legs, Klara, Margita or A Journey into a Former Life, Judith, John the Baptist, Pontius Pilate, The Only Witness to Beauty, Kafka's Friend and A Few Birds and One Sky along with two collections of short stories entitled Small Unusual People and Stories of Solitude.

In his early novels, Gavran describes the life in the Croatian provinces, featuring everyday folk, anti-heroes of sorts, who retain a positive stance towards life even when they are confronted with injustice and major difficulties. This is perhaps best seen in his novel, Forgotten Son (1989), in which the central personage is a slightly mentally challenged young man of twenty. As a forty-year-old, Gavran started to write psychological-existential novels inspired by biblical characters, bringing them nearer to the sensibilities of contemporary readers. These books have been popular with both believers and non-believers, since their messages are universal.

Gavran's books have been published worldwide. Gavran has received over 30 literary awards in Croatia and abroad, including the CENTRAL EUROPEAN TIME Award, given annually in Budapest to the best Central European author for the overall opus, as well as the EUROPEAN CIRCLE Award given to writers for the confirmation of European values in their texts.

Gavran has also written ten books for children and young people: All Sorts of Things in My Head, How Dad Won Mum, Head Over Heels in Love, Happy Days, Farewell Letter, Plays with a Head and a Tail, Try to Forget, Plays for children, The Teacher of My Dreams and A Summer to Remember. These books have also found their way to adult readers.

Personal life and awards 
Gavran earned his degree in dramaturgy at the Academy of Theatre, Film and Television in Zagreb. He first worked as a dramaturge and artistic director at the ITD Theatre in Zagreb (1986 – 1992). Since January 1993, he has been living and working as a freelance, professional writer. His theatre and prose texts have been included in numerous anthologies in Croatia and elsewhere, and his work is sometimes studied at universities.

Since April 2014 Gavran has been a full member of the Russian Academy of Literature and since May 2014 an associate member of the Croatian Academy of Science and Art. In November 2016 he became member of the Slovene Literature and Arts Academy whose residence is Varna in Bulgaria.

Gavran was given the “Dr Alois Mock Europapreis 2017” award in December 2017. The Alois Mock award has been handed since the early 2000s to notable individuals who, in the spirit of the European idea of community, have promoted European values and unity through their literary or journalistic work, activities in the public sector, in organizations or in business. He received the Decoration of Honour in Gold for Services to the Republic of Austria in Austrian Cultural Forum, Zagreb on March 20. It was awarded to him by the president of the Republic of Austria.

He was named the first Tie Ambassador by the Academia Cravatica from Zagreb in September 2018.

He is married to the actress Mladena Gavran, and they founded the GAVRAN Theatre in 2002. Their son Jakov is also an actor.

Gavran has had a festival dedicated solely to his dramas and comedies in five different countries. The festival known as the GavranFest was founded in the city of Trnava in Slovakia in 2003, moved to Kraków in Poland in 2013, from 2016 to 2018 held in Prague in the Czech Republic, in 2019 in Augsburg in Germany, and 2020 Belgrade, Serbia.

Novels 

Forgotten Son
How We Broke Our Legs
Clara
Margite
Judith
John the Baptist
Pontius Pilate
The Only Witness to Beauty
Kafka's Friend
A Few Birds and One Sky

Theatrical plays 

1983. Creon's Antigone
1986. Night Of The Gods
1988. George Washington's Loves
1989. Chekhov Says Good-bye To Tolstoy
1990. Royalty And Rogues
1991. My Wife's Husband
1993. Dr. Freud's Patient
1994. Shakespeare And Elizabeth
1995. Death Of An Actor
1997. Forget Hollywood
2000. All About Women
2003. How To Kill The President
2005. Nora In Our Time
2006. All About Men
2007. Parallel Worlds
2008. Greta Garbo's Secret
2009. The Craziest Show In The World
2011. Couples
2012. The Doll
2014. Ice Cream
2015. Beer
2016. The Patients
2018. Your Every Birthday
2020. The Perfect Partner

References

External links 
Official website
Gavran theatre

1961 births
Living people
Croatian novelists
Croatian male writers
Male novelists
Croatian dramatists and playwrights
Postmodern writers